Eldetal is a municipality in the Mecklenburgische Seenplatte district, in Mecklenburg-Vorpommern, Germany. It was created with effect from 26 May 2019 by the merger of the former municipalities of Grabow-Below, Massow, Wredenhagen and Zepkow. It takes its name from the river Elde, that flows through the municipality.

References

Mecklenburgische Seenplatte (district)